The Dombild Altarpiece (also known as Kölner Dombild, German for “Cologne cathedral picture/painting”) is a painted triptych by the German 15th-century artist Stefan Lochner. Originally painted for the council-chapel St. Maria in Jerusalem in Cologne, it was moved to Cologne Cathedral in 1810 and is now in that church's Marienkapelle, south of the choir. It is also known as the Three Kings Altarpiece (Dreikönigsaltar) and the Patron Saints of Cologne Altarpiece (Altar der Kölner Stadtpatrone). 

The first written mention of the painting is in the travel diaries of Albrecht Dürer, who saw it in 1520 whilst he was en route to the Netherlands, noting that he paid two Weißpfennig to see a painting by "Master Steffan of Cologne". The work centres on the Three Kings, whose relics were in Cologne. The central panel is 260 x 285 cm, whilst each of the side panels is 260 by 142 cm. On the left panel is Ursula of Cologne with some of the 11,000 virgins with whom she was martyred, and on the right panel is St Gereon of Cologne. 

When the altarpiece is closed, the reverse of the two side panels show an Annunciation scene.

Bibliography

External links 

 

Cologne Cathedral
Culture in Cologne
15th-century paintings
Adoration of the Magi in art
Triptychs
Paintings depicting the Annunciation
Paintings of Saint Ursula